Kullekul (Küllequl) is a rural locality (a village) in Udryakbashevsky Selsoviet, Blagovarsky District, Bashkortostan, Russia. The population was 153 as of 2010. There are 2 streets.

Geography 
Kullekul is located 28 km southwest of Yazykovo (the district's administrative centre) by road. Khaydarovo is the nearest rural locality.

References 

Rural localities in Blagovarsky District